Invasion of Manchuria can refer to: 

 Japanese invasion of Manchuria (1894)
 Russian invasion of Manchuria (1900)
 Japanese invasion of Manchuria (1931)
 Soviet invasion of Manchuria (1945)